Two-Way Mirror is the third studio album of the band Crystal Antlers. It was released by Recreation Ltd. on July 12, 2011. Former albums of the band was released by Touch And Go Records.

Track listing

 "Jules' Story" - 3:27
 "Seance" - 2:57
 "Summer Solstice" - 3:16
 "By the Sawkill" - 3:45
 "Two-Way Mirror" - 3:01
 "Way Out" - 1:42
 "Fortune Telling" - 3:05
 "Always Afraid" - 1:57
 "Knee Deep" - 2:24
 "Sun-Bleached" - 2:27
 "Dog Days" - 6:38

Personnel

Jonny Bell: Vocals, Bass
Andrew King: Guitar
Cora Foxx: Keys
Damian Edwards: Percussion
Kevin Stewart: Drums

References

2011 albums
Crystal Antlers albums